Harold "Huns" Gustrowsky is an American curler, originally from Pardeeville, Wisconsin.

From 1988 to 1990 he was a president of Wisconsin State Curling Association.

As of 1985, Gustrowsky worked as a field claims representative for Employers Insurance of Wausau.

Teams

References

External links
 

Living people
American male curlers
American curling champions
People from Pardeeville, Wisconsin
Year of birth missing (living people)